The United States Navy Recruiting Command (NRC or NAVCRUITCOM) is located in Millington, Tennessee. It aims to recruit both enlisted sailors and prospective commissioned officers for the United States Navy. NRC covers the entire United States with 26 Navy Talent Acquisition Groups commanded by Three Navy Recruiting Regions. Region East Central and West. 

, the Commander, Navy Recruiting Command is Rear Admiral Alexis T. Walker.

NRC received the Meritorious Unit Commendation for the period October 1, 2007 through September 30, 2008.

See also
Navy Personnel Command/Bureau of Naval Personnel
Comparable organizations
 United States Army Recruiting Command
 Marine Corps Recruiting Command (U.S. Marine Corps)
 Air Education and Training Command (U.S. Air Force)

References

1. https://www.cnrc.navy.mil/about.htm—NRC Brief History. Retrieved 2017-03-01.
2. https://www.cnrc.navy.mil/pages-nrc-links/nrc-facts-stats.htm—FY2017 Facts and Stats. Retrieved 2017-03-01.
3. https://www.cnrc.navy.mil/pages-leadership/nrc-commander.html. Retrieved 2022-02-09.

External links
Official recruiting website
Official command website

Recruiting
Military recruitment
United States Navy schools and training
Military units and formations in Tennessee